Asghar Azizi Aghdam (born 26 December 1987) is an Iranian para taekwondo practitioner. He won the gold medal in the men's +75 kg event at the 2020 Summer Paralympics in Tokyo, Japan.

References

Living people
1987 births
People from Mianeh
Iranian male taekwondo practitioners
Taekwondo practitioners at the 2020 Summer Paralympics
Medalists at the 2020 Summer Paralympics
Paralympic gold medalists for Iran
Paralympic medalists in taekwondo
21st-century Iranian people